Zelyony Lug is a rural locality (a selo) and the administrative center of Zelyonolugovskoy Selsoviet, Rodinsky District, Altai Krai, Russia. The population was 523 as of 2013. There are 6 streets.

Geography 
Zelyony Lug is located 16 km south of Rodino (the district's administrative centre) by road. Shatalovka is the nearest rural locality.

References 

Rural localities in Rodinsky District